Martin Bodák (born November 28, 1998) is a Slovak professional ice hockey defenceman currently playing for HK Nitra of the Slovak Extraliga.

Bodák previously played four games in the Finnish Liiga for Tappara during the 2016–17 Liiga season. He also played two seasons in the Western Hockey League for the Kootenay Ice. He signed with HC Vítkovice Ridera on May 9, 2019.

Career statistics

Regular season and playoffs

International

References

External links

1998 births
Living people
Kootenay Ice players
Lempäälän Kisa players
Sportspeople from Spišská Nová Ves
HC RT Torax Poruba players
HC ZUBR Přerov players
Slovak ice hockey defencemen
Tappara players
HC Vítkovice players
HK Nitra players
Slovak expatriate ice hockey players in Canada
Slovak expatriate ice hockey players in the Czech Republic
Slovak expatriate ice hockey players in Finland